Judge Cecil may refer to:

Lamar John Ryan Cecil (1902–1958), judge of the United States District Court for the Eastern District of Texas
Lester LeFevre Cecil (1893–1982), judge of the United States Court of Appeals for the Sixth Circuit